Mount Young is a mountain on West Falkland in the Falkland Islands, reaching a height of . It is in the far south of the island, near Cape Meredith and Port Albemarle It is east of Port Stephens and is south west of Mount Emery.

References

Young